Zandhoven is a municipality in the Belgian province of Antwerp. In 2021, Zandhoven had a population of 13,124. The total area is 40.10 km2.

Sports
Women's volleyball club VBC Zandhoven plays at the highest level of the Belgian league pyramid.

References

External links
 
  Official website

Municipalities of Antwerp Province
Populated places in Antwerp Province